Luigia Abbadia (1821–1896) was an Italian operatic mezzo-soprano known for her fine voice, secure technique, and a strong temperament. Possessing an uncommonly wide range, Abbadia sang several roles traditionally portrayed by sopranos in addition to roles from the mezzo-soprano repertoire.

Biography
Abbadia was born in Genoa to composer Natale Abbadia. She studied music under her father before making her professional opera debut at Sassari in 1836. Over the next several years she appeared in operas throughout Italy, including performances in Novara, Brescia, Triest, Monza, Turin, Bologna, Padua and Piacenza. In 1838 she sang the role of Agnese de Maino in Bellini's Beatrice di Tenda in Mantua. In 1840 she sang the role of Corilla in Donizetti's Le convenienze ed inconvenienze teatrali in Vienna. That same year she originated the role of Giulietta di Kelbar in the world premiere of Verdi's Un giorno di regno at La Scala and originated the role of Rovena in Nicolai's Il templario at the Teatro Regio in Turin. The following year she returned to La Scala to create the roles of Ines in the original production of Donizetti's Maria Padilla and the role of Delizia in the original production of Federico Ricci's Corrado d'Altamura. Her other roles at La Scala included Marie in La fille du régiment, Elvira in Ernani, Emilia in Mercadante's La vestale, Eleonora in Donizetti's Torquato Tasso, and the title roles in Donizetti's Alina, regina di Golconda and Pacini's Saffo. Other highlights of her stage career included portrayals of Alisa in Donizetti's Lucia di Lammermoor, Angelina in Rossini's La Cenerentola, Arsace in Rossini's Semiramide, and Normanno in Mercadante's I Normanni a Parigi.

In 1860–61 Abbadia participated in a tour of Germany with the opera company of Achille Lorini which included performances in Berlin and Hamburg among other cities. After retiring from the stage in 1870 she established a singing school in Milan. Several of her pupils went on to have successful opera careers including mezzo-soprano Giuseppina Pasqua and tenor Giovanni Battista De Negri.

References

Elizabeth Forbes: "Luigia Abbadia", Grove Music Online ed. L. Macy (Accessed 23 September 2008), (subscription access)
Luigia Abbadia biography from Operissimo.com (In German)

Italian mezzo-sopranos
Italian opera singers
Operatic mezzo-sopranos
1821 births
1896 deaths
Musicians from Genoa
19th-century Italian singers
19th-century Italian women singers